Tinker Island is a freemium mobile game developed by Slovenian studio Tricky Tribe and published by Kongregate. It is available on iOS and Android and combines a text based narrative, card based controls and survival mechanics. Players lead a team of shipwrecked survivors and guide them to explore a mysterious but dangerous tropical island.

Gameplay 
Tinker Island is a text based gamebook-like simulation game, where the core gameplay is based on sending a survivor depicted as a card to perform various tasks such as forage, labor, explore or build. Content is delivered by means of IM chat-like interface and multiple choice answers. Players need to explore the island and uncover over 60 different locations

See also 
 Reigns

References

Additional references

Experience Exciting Adventure of the Tinker Island Game AppCheaters. 07/12/16. Retrieved: 06/06/18
Experience Tinker Island: Survival game with 8-bit graphics [Translated]. Infogame. 03/08/16. Retrieved: 06/06/18
Dinky survival-strategy Tinker Island: Survival Adventure out now on iTunes PocketGamer. Emily Sowden. 27/07/16. Retrieved: 06/06/18
‘Tinker Island’ Strategic Adventure Game Is A Fun Take On The Gamebook Genre. Retrieved May 23, 2018
 Universal Tinker Island: Survival Adventure (by Kongregate). Retrieved June 15, 2018

External links
 
 

Android (operating system) games
Free-to-play video games
2016 video games
IOS games
Casual games
Survival video games
Adventure games
Mobile games
Video games developed in Slovenia
Video games set on fictional islands